Graham Christopher Rowntree (born 18 April 1971) is an English rugby union former player and current head coach of Irish club Munster. He played loosehead prop for Leicester Tigers and England.  He was capped 54 times for England, despite having to compete for his position with one of the world's most capped forwards, Jason Leonard. Rowntree was born in Stockton-on-Tees. He was educated at John Cleveland College, Hinckley, Leicestershire, which has also produced other rugby union players.

Career
In 1988 he joined Leicester Tigers from Nuneaton and made his first-team debut against Oxford University in 1990. For much of that time he was in harness with the famous ‘ABC club’ alongside Richard Cockerill and Darren Garforth. At Leicester Rowntree enjoyed great domestic success, and started both the 2001 and 2002 Heineken Cup finals.

In 1993 he made his England A, Barbarians and Midlands debuts, and on 18 March 1995 he gained his first full England cap against Scotland in the 1995 Five Nations Championship as a temporary replacement for Jason Leonard. He subsequently played in the 1995 Rugby World Cup. He also made the 1997 British Lions tour to South Africa, playing 6 games and the 1999 Rugby World Cup.

After the 1999 World Cup Graham was not capped for almost 2 years until a series of fine performances for his club forced him back into international contention. He was prominent throughout the pre-2003 Rugby World Cup years. He was selected for the England squad to tour Canada and the US in 2001, participated in all that season's Autumn internationals — being named as man of the match in England's 21–15 Cook Cup victory over Australia — and started in each of the 2002 Six Nations games. He started in England's 15–13 win over New Zealand in Wellington in 2003 and put in a particularly memorable performance against the All Blacks when England's pack was reduced to just 6 men. Despite playing in the 2003 pre-World Cup trial match in France, Rowntree was omitted from Clive Woodward's squad, which won the tournament. Clive Woodward admitted that leaving Rowntree behind was one of the hardest decisions he had to make in his time as England head coach.

Rowntree returned to the England side in the 2004 Six Nations and was the first-choice loosehead prop for the 2004 Autumn Internationals.

Coaching
Rowntree retired from rugby in 2007 after 17 years playing the game, and he joined the Tigers coaching team where he made a rapid rise up the coaching ranks, becoming the forwards/scrum coach for the English national team ahead of the 2008 Six Nations Championship. He toured South Africa with the British & Irish Lions in 2009, acting as scrum coach, before being named forwards coach for the winning test series against Australia in 2013 and scrum coach for the drawn series with New Zealand in 2017.

Following the resignation of head coach Stuart Lancaster on 11 November 2015, newly appointed head coach Eddie Jones sacked the whole coaching team, with Rowntree leaving his post with England after eight years in December 2015. At the end of the 2015–16 English Premiership season, it was announced that Harlequins had appointed Rowntree as their new forwards coach. Rowntree joined the Georgian national team in 2018, but left after the 2019 Rugby World Cup to join Irish province Munster as their new forwards coach. He signed a two-year contract extension with Munster in January 2022, and, in April 2022, the province confirmed that Rowntree would replace Johann van Graan as head coach from the 2022–23 season.

Notes

External links
 England profile
 Rowntree @ Planet Rugby Player stats from Planet Rugby
 Sporting heroes

1971 births
Living people
Barbarian F.C. players
British & Irish Lions rugby union players from England
England international rugby union players
English rugby union coaches
English rugby union players
Leicester Tigers players
Rugby union players from Stockton-on-Tees
Rugby union props
Munster Rugby non-playing staff